Slum Village is the fifth studio album by American hip hop group Slum Village, released on October 25, 2005 on the independent label Barak Records.

The release includes a bonus DVD which includes footage on the making of the album as well as an interview with T3 and Elzhi on the group's history. The DVD also features Slum Village's first two music videos "Climax (Girl Shit)" and "Raise It Up" from the album Fantastic, Vol. 2.

The first single from the album was "EZ Up". The song was notable for appearing in a commercial to promote the 2006 Chevrolet HHR and 2006 Chevrolet Impala, albeit with different lyrics.

Track listing
"Giant" (R.L. Altman, Jason Powers, Ralph J. Rice, II)
"Set It" (R.L. Altman, Jason Powers, Curtis Cross)
"Can I Be Me" (R.L. Altman, Jason Powers, Curtis Cross, Ralph J. Rice, II)
"Call Me" (feat. Dwele) (R.L. Altman, Jason Powers, Curtis Cross, Ralph J. Rice, II, Ronald Isley, Rudolph Isley, Marvin Isley, O'Kelly Isley, Ernie Isley, Chris Jasper)
"05" (R.L. Altman, Jason Powers, Ralph J. Rice, II)
"1,2" (R.L. Altman, Jason Powers, Jason Connoy)
"Multiply" (R.L. Altman, Jason Powers, Ralph J. Rice, II, Curtis Cross, Melanie Rutherford, Raymone Boggues, Robert Fripp, Michael Giles, Greg Lake, Ian McDonald, Peter Sinfield)
"1-800-S-L-U-M" (R.L. Altman, Ron Watts, Ralph J. Rice, II)
"Hear This" (feat. Phat Kat & Black Milk) (R.L. Altman, Jason Powers, Ron Watts, Curtis Cross)
"Def Do Us" (R.L. Altman, Jason Powers, Ralph J. Rice, II)
"Hell Naw!" (feat. Black Milk & Que D) (R.L. Altman, Jason Powers, Ernest Toney, Curtis Cross)
"EZ Up" (feat. J Isaac) (R.L. Altman, Jason Powers, Ralph J. Rice, II, Andwele Gardner, Curtis Cross)
"Fantastic" (R.L. Altman, Jason Powers, Ralph J. Rice, II)

Samples
 "Call Me" contains a sample of "Footsteps in the Dark", as performed by The Isley Brothers
 "Multiply" contains a sample of "I Talk to the Wind", as performed by King Crimson

Personnel
 Carl Broaden, Alvin Moore - keyboards
 DJ Dez - turntables, drums
 Tony Womack - horns
 Melanie Rutherford, Samiyyah - background vocals
 Young RJ - production, recording, mixing
 Black Milk - production
 Sterling Sound - mastering
 Jesper Skou Boelling - photography
 Motorcity - art direction, design

References

2005 albums
Slum Village albums
Albums produced by Black Milk
Albums produced by MoSS